Gadi may refer to:

Places 
 Gadi, Nepal, a village development committee in Parsa District in the Narayani Zone of southern Nepal
 Gadi Bayalkada, a village development committee in Surkhet District in the Bheri Zone of mid-western Nepal

People 
 Chris Gadi (born 1992), French footballer
 Fida Hussain Gadi, Pakistani intellectual
 Gadi Brumer (born 1973), Israeli footballer who played for Maccabi Tel Aviv
 Gadi Eizenkot (born 1960), general in the Israel Defense Forces
 Gadi Kinda (born 1994), Israeli footballer
 Gadi Schwartz (born 1983), American journalist
 Gadi Shamni (born 1959),  general in the Israel Defense Forces
 Gadi Taub (born 1965), Israeli historian, author, screenwriter, and political commentator
 Gadi Yatziv (1937–2004), Israeli academic and politician

Other uses
 Gadi, a throne in South Asia
 House of Gadi, a dynasty of kings of the Northern Kingdom of Israel
 Gaɗi language, spoken in Nigeria
 Gaddi language, spoken in India
 Gadi tribe, an ethnic group of India

See also
 Gaddi (disambiguation)
 Ghadi (disambiguation)
 Swaminarayan Gadi (disambiguation)